Lucy Christopher is a British/Australian author best known for her novel Stolen, which won the Branford Boase award 2010 in the UK, and the 2010 Gold Inky in Australia. Her second book, Flyaway, was shortlisted for the 2010 Costa Book Awards and the 2010 Waterstone's Children's Book Prize. She currently lives between Australia and the United Kingdom and has just finished her first book for an adult audience, RELEASE.

Life
Lucy grew up in Australia and attended Mentone Girls' Grammar School,. She works as a senior lecturer at in Creative Writing at UTAS, Tasmania. She studied for an MA in creative writing at Bath Spa University after which she became course director.
She visited the school of Mexico "Instituto Verde Valle" in Guadalajara. There she gave a conference about her books.

Bibliography
Stolen (2009/2010) or in Spanish Robada una carta a mi secuestrador
Flyaway (2012)
The Killing Woods (2013) or in Spanish El bosque del verdugo
Storm-wake (5 April 2018)
Shadow (2019)
The Queen on Our Corner (2021)
Release (2022)

Awards
Branford Boase award
Printz Honor Award
Southern Schools Book Award
Gold Inky
Hull Children's Book Award

References

External links
Branford Boase Award

Living people
Australian women novelists
Year of birth missing (living people)
People educated at Mentone Girls' Grammar School
Alumni of Bath Spa University
Australian children's writers
21st-century Australian writers
Academic staff of the University of Tasmania